The 2013 Wartburg Knights football team represented Wartburg College as a member of the Iowa Intercollegiate Athletic Conference (IIAC) during the 2013 NCAA Division III football season. Led by Rick Willis in his 15th season as head coach, the Knights compiled an overall record of 9–3 with a mark of 6–1 in conference play, winning the IIAC for the 13th time and first since 2010. The win title earned them an automatic bid to the NCAA Division III Football Championship playoffs. Wartburg lost in the second round of the playoffs to .The team played home games at Walston-Hoover Stadium in Waverly, Iowa.

Schedule
Wartburg's 2013 regular season scheduled consisted of five home and five away games.

References

Wartburg
Wartburg Knights football seasons
Wartburg Knights football